The Chicagoland Sports Hall of Fame, located in the Hawthorne Race Course, in Stickney/Cicero, near Chicago, honors sports greats associated with the Chicago metropolitan area. It was founded in 1979 as a trailer owned by the Olympia Brewing Company parked at Soldier Field in Chicago. The Chicago Park District took over the exhibits in 1983. From 1988 the exhibits were displayed in Mike Ditka's restaurant until the restaurant closed in 1991. The Hall of Fame moved to the Maryville Academy in Des Plaines in 1996 and has operated under the guidance of Father John P. Smyth since that time. As of 2008, it was operating at Hawthorne.

Directors include Smyth, former Chicago Park District Superintendent Ed Kelly, DePaul University Athletic Director Jean Lenti-Ponsetto, and former Chicago Bears tight end Emery Moorehead.
 
The honorees include high-school athletes, such as Babe Baranowski who quarterbacked the 1937 Leo Catholic High School team in the Prep Bowl football game in Soldier Field, viewed by a record 120,000 spectators, high-school coaches, college athletes from as far away as the University of Illinois at Urbana–Champaign and the University of Notre Dame, as well as professional and Olympic athletes associated with Chicago. Their sports include everything from baseball, basketball, football, and hockey to bowling, fishing, golf, and horse racing. Two special awards, the Lifetime Achievement Award, and the Ray Meyer Coach of the Year Award may honor non-Chicagoans.

Honorees

See also
Chicago Cubs award winners and league leaders#Chicagoland Sports Hall of Fame

References

External links
Chicagoland Sports Hall of Fame

Cicero, Illinois
Chicago metropolitan area
Museums in Cook County, Illinois
Halls of fame in Chicago
Sports museums in Illinois
All-sports halls of fame
Awards established in 1979
1979 establishments in Illinois